Bortnik (Bortnyk) is a Belarusian and Ukrainian surname. The historical meaning of the surname is beekeeper. Notable people with the surname include:

Aída Bortnik (1938–2013), Argentine screenwriter
Bogdan Bortnik (born 1992), Ukrainian footballer
Ivan Bortnik (1939–2019), Russian actor

See also
 Bortnikov, a Russian surname of the same origin
 Bortnick, an Americanized version of Bortnik

Belarusian-language surnames
Ukrainian-language surnames